Corydoras condiscipulus is a species of Corydoras catfish found in the Oyapock River of French Guiana and Brazil.
It is found in the whole river, much of which is blackwater and covered by rainforest. 

External links

Corydoras condiscipulus - seriouslyfish.com

Corydoras
Fish described in 1980